The Câlneș (also: Bahna) is a left tributary of the river Bistrița in Romania. It flows into the Bistrița near Mănoaia.

References

Rivers of Romania
Rivers of Neamț County